Say What You're Thinking is an album by New Zealand reggae band, Katchafire. It was released in New Zealand on 14 August 2007 and in Australia on 17 November 2007.

Track listing
"Say What You’re Thinking" (J. Ferguson) – 4:55
"Now Girl" (L. Davey) – 3:58
"Doesn't Anybody" (J. Ferguson) – 4:16
"Mr Flava" (L. Bell, J. Bell) – 4:57
"J Dubb" (J. Bell) – 4:27
"This World" (H. Totowera) – 3:57
"Hold On" (J. Ferguson) – 3:54
"Love Letter" (L. Davey) – 3:33
"Ultra Music" (L. Bell, J. Bell) – 5:36
"Meant To Be" (L. Bell) – 5:16
"Pain" (J. Ferguson) – 5:21
"Working" (L. Bell, J. Bell, J. Lee) – 3:36
Bonus track: "Agent-H" (Instrumental) (Not included on album release, track can be purchased through iTunes as single release)

Katchafire albums
2007 albums